Phil O'Shea (16 April 1889 – 1980) was a New Zealand racing cyclist.

Early life
O'Shea was born in 1889 in Ashburton, a town in Canterbury, New Zealand.

Cycling career
O'Shea was known as The Champion. The achievement was all the more remarkable by the 11-year gap between the first race in 1911 and the second race in 1922, mostly accounted for by the intervention of World War I. O'Shea again set the fastest time in 1923.

New Zealand racing
Phil O’Shea was an active cyclist and was racing from 1909 to 1932; a remarkably long time. In that period he raced an estimated 1420 times both on the road and on the track. He won numerous events. On the track he held at various times the New Zealand record for all distances from a quarter of a mile up to five miles. Apart from the Australian road races mentioned above, he won or gained fastest time in several Timaru to Christchurch races, (about 100 miles) and a number of shorter road races.

War service

O'Shea enlisted with the New Zealand Expeditionary Force and served as a despatch rider.

Bibliography

References

1889 births
1980 deaths
New Zealand male cyclists
Sportspeople from Ashburton, New Zealand